The Amarillo National Center is a 10,000-seat multi-purpose arena in Amarillo, Texas. It was built in 2000. Along with the Amarillo Civic Center, it hosts local concerts and sporting events for the Amarillo area.

The arena contains 5,000 permanent seats and its  arena floor can hold an additional 5,000 floor seats.

The center is named for locally owned Amarillo National Bank.

External links
Amarillo National Center

Indoor arenas in Texas
Buildings and structures in Amarillo, Texas
Sports in Amarillo, Texas
2000 establishments in Texas